Whitehall is an unincorporated community located within Andover Township in Sussex County, New Jersey, United States.

Panther Lake, and the Panther Lake Camping Resort, occupy the east side of the settlement.  Located west of Whitehall is the northern tip of Allamuchy Mountain State Park.

History
The former Sussex Railroad passed through Whitehall.

In 1872, it was noted that the largest building in Whitehall "was formerly a tavern where the Newark and Oswego stages used to stop".

References

Andover Township, New Jersey
Unincorporated communities in Sussex County, New Jersey
Unincorporated communities in New Jersey